Kankanadi or Kankanady is one of the major upscale commercial and residential localities of Mangalore city. It houses many highrise buildings and  transforming into a highrise hub of Mangalore CBD region along with its major counterparts like Bejai, Kadri, Attavar & Falnir. It is one of the busiest localities of Mangalore.

Overview
 The Pumpwell Flyover on the NH-66, is the starting point of NH-75, the national highway connecting Mangalore and Bangalore.
 The Father Muller's Hospital located in Kankanadi is one of the famous hospitals in coastal Karnataka.  
 The head office of leading private sector bank Karnataka Bank is now located near Pumpwell Flyover, Kankanady on NH-66.
 Kankanadi is also the starting point for some of the city buses in Mangalore and shuttle buses near the Karavali Circle.
 There is a separate flower market and vegetable market at Kankanadi, popularly known as Kankanadi market.
 Kankanady by itself spans a very large area and buses from Mangaladevi, statebank pass through this point towards major destinations like Thokottu, Deralakatte, Ullal, Talapady, Mudipu, Kasaragod, Kannur, BC Road, Puttur, Bangalore, Mysore, Kerala thus making it a common point.

Railway station
The starting of Konkan Railway made Kankanadi railway station a busy junction. The Kankanadi station situated about 5 km from the city is the official railway station for trains, such as Rajdhani and Garib Raths, which does not go the Mangalore city railway station as it is a terminating point. The station, which comes under the Palghat division on the Southern Railway line, lacks proper maintenance.

Educational institutions

The Father Muller's hospital campus houses the following educational institutions.
 Father Muller Medical College
 Father Muller's Institute of Homoeopothic Medical College
 Father Muller College of Nursing.
 Colaco School of Nursing 

There is also a high school named St Joseph boys high school in this area.

Gallery

Major commercial buildings & malls 
 Shalimar Mangalore Gate
 Mak Mall
 Essel Wilcon
 Lilia Arcade

Major IT companies
 Cognizant

Major restaurants
 Barbeque Nation
 Domino's Pizza
 Onesta Pizza
 Pulimunchi
 La Pino'z Pizza
 Cochin Village Restaurant
 Kairali Adukkala
 Royal Darbar
 The Smoke House
 Janatha Lunch Home
 Danish Food Court
 Kankanady Rajkamal Restaurant
 Bamboo Restaurant
 Brown Rice
 Martin's
 Suman Sagar

Religious places
Shree Brahma Baidarkala Garadi Kshetra is a religious place at Garodi in Kankanadi and is of much significance to the Billava community. This temple is dedicated to the twin cultural heroes Koti-Chennaya who lived in the 17th century and belongs to the Billawa community.
 Mahakali Temple, Ujjodi, AC
 "Shree Sathya Saaramani Daivasthana" is a religious place at Kudukorigudda in Kankanadi and is of much significance to the Aadidravida Dalit community. This temple is dedicated to the twin cultural heroes Kaanada Katada (Saara Muppanna) who lived in the 17th century and belongs to the Aadidravida Dalit community.

See also 
 Kadri
 Attavar
 Bejai
 Falnir
 Balmatta
 Sasihithlu Beach
 NITK Beach
 Panambur Beach
 Tannirbhavi Beach
 Ullal beach
 Someshwar Beach
 Pilikula Nisargadhama
 Kadri Park
 Tagore Park
 St. Aloysius Chapel
 Bejai Museum
 Aloyseum
 Kudla Kudru

References

Localities in Mangalore